Marcus Elliot Jones (born October 22, 1998) is an American football cornerback and return specialist for the New England Patriots of the National Football League (NFL). He played college football at Troy and Houston and was drafted by the Patriots in the third round of the 2022 NFL Draft.

Early life and high school
Jones grew up in Enterprise, Alabama and attended Enterprise High School, where he played basketball and football. He was named all-state as a senior after recording 27 tackles with five interceptions and 16 passes broken up on defense and returning three punts and one kickoff for touchdowns.

College career
Jones began his college football career at Troy. He was named the Sun Belt Conference Freshman of the Year and second-team all-conference as a return specialist after returning 30 kickoffs for 879 yards and three touchdowns and 14 for 121 yards while also intercepting two passes on defense, one of which was returned for a touchdown. As a sophomore, he was named first-team All-Sun Belt as a return specialist after returning 23 kickoffs for 584 yards and one touchdown and to the second-team as a cornerback after breaking up eight passes with one interception. After his sophomore season Jones entered the transfer portal and later announced that he would be transferring to the University of Houston.

After sitting out one season and redshirting due to NCAA transfer rules, Jones had 24 tackles, 2.0 tackles for loss and one interception on defense. Jones was also named first-team All-American Athletic Conference as a return specialist after leading the nation with 337 yards on 17 punt returns with one returned for a touchdown. During his redshirt senior season Jones returned a kickoff 100 yards for a touchdown with 17 seconds left against 19th-ranked SMU to win the game 44–37. To cap off the season he won the Paul Hornung Award, given to the nation's most versatile player, and was selected  to the Associated Press All-America first team as a defensive back. He also won AAC Special Teams Player of the Year along with being named first-team All-AAC as a return specialist and second-team All-AAC as a cornerback.

Professional career

Jones was selected by the New England Patriots in the third round (85th overall) of the 2022 NFL Draft. In Week 11 against the New York Jets, Jones returned a game-winning punt return touchdown for 84 yards with just 5 seconds remaining in the 10–3 win. Jones' touchdown was the first punt return touchdown of the entire 2022 season. In the Patriots' Week 13 game against the Buffalo Bills on Thursday Night Football, Jones scored his first career offensive touchdown on a 48-yard catch-and-run reception, on the first offensive snap of his career. It was the first receiving touchdown from scrimmage by a defensive back since the Jets' Marcus Coleman in 2000, also against the Bills. In the Patriots' Christmas Eve game against the Cincinnati Bengals, Jones scored on a 69-yard pick six, making him the first player in 45 years to score a touchdown on offense, defense, and special teams in the same season.

Jones finished his rookie season with 39 tackles, seven passes defended, and two interceptions on defense and four receptions for 78 yards and one touchdown on offense. He led the NFL with 362 punt return yards and 12.5 yards per punt return with one punt returned for a touchdown while finishing fifth in the league with 645 kick return yards. Jones was named first team All-Pro as a punt returner by the Associated Press.

NFL career statistics

References

External links
 New England Patriots bio
Troy Trojans bio
Houston Cougars bio

1998 births
Living people
People from Enterprise, Alabama
Players of American football from Alabama
American football cornerbacks
Troy Trojans football players
Houston Cougars football players
All-American college football players
New England Patriots players